Eichelberger High School, also known as Hanover Middle School and Eichelberger Academy, is a historic high school building located at Hanover, York County, Pennsylvania.  It was built in 1896, and altered and expanded in 1931-1932, with few design elements from the original building remaining.  It is a five-part brick building in the Georgian Revival style, with a main building flanked by two wings connected by hyphens.  The main building features a portico supported by six Ionic order columns and topped by a hipped roof and cupola.

It was added to the National Register of Historic Places in 1995. It is located in the Hanover Historic District.

Notable students
John Hostetter (1946–2016), actor
Kaye Lynn McCool (1946–), Singer-Songwriter

References

School buildings on the National Register of Historic Places in Pennsylvania
Georgian Revival architecture in Pennsylvania
Buildings and structures in York County, Pennsylvania
National Register of Historic Places in York County, Pennsylvania
1896 establishments in Pennsylvania